Kollaps Tradixionales is the sixth full-length album by the experimental rock group Thee Silver Mt. Zion under the name Thee Silver Mt. Zion Memorial Orchestra. It was released in February 2010 on Constellation Records. The songs "I Built Myself a Metal Bird", "I Fed My Metal Bird the Wings of Other Metal Birds" and "There Is a Light" were played on earlier tours.

For this album, the band started a blog on their official website. This is also the first record with drummer David Payant, after the former drummer Eric Craven left the band.

Typical for Constellation Records releases, the album was released with some extras. The CD comes in a gatefold, paperboard jacket. The vinyl is available as a double 10" that includes a copy of the CD, a 16-page art book with collages made by Menuck and filmmaker/photographer Jem Cohen, and a limited edition poster.

Track listing

Personnel 
Thee Silver Mt. Zion Memorial Orchestra
Thierry Amar – contrabass, horn arrangement, vocals
Efrim Menuck – guitar, organ, piano, vocals
Jessica Moss – violin, vocals
David Payant – drums, organ, piano, vocals
Sophie Trudeau – violin, vocals

Horn section on "There Is a Light"
Gordon Allen – trumpet
Adam Kinner – tenor saxophone
Matana Roberts – alto saxophone
Jason Sharp – baritone saxophone

Production
Howard Bilerman – production
Radwan Moumneh – production
Harris Newman at Greymarket – mastering

References 

2010 albums
Thee Silver Mt. Zion albums
Constellation Records (Canada) albums
Albums produced by Howard Bilerman